Viktoriya Andreyeva (born 21 June 1992) is a Russian swimmer. At the 2012 Summer Olympics, she competed for the national team in the 4×100 metre freestyle relay, finishing in 10th place in the heats and failing to reach the final.

References

Russian female swimmers
1992 births
Living people
Olympic swimmers of Russia
Swimmers at the 2012 Summer Olympics
Swimmers at the 2016 Summer Olympics
Russian female freestyle swimmers
Swimmers from Saint Petersburg
European Aquatics Championships medalists in swimming
Universiade medalists in swimming
Universiade gold medalists for Russia
Universiade silver medalists for Russia
20th-century Russian women
21st-century Russian women